The Sharif family is a political family from Pakistan, based in the city of Lahore, Punjab. They belong to the Bhat Kashmiri tribe, which is a large community living in many districts of Punjab. The family uses the title of Mian.

Muhammad Sharif, the father of former Prime Minister of Pakistan Nawaz Sharif, migrated from Jati Umra, Amritsar District (now in Tarn Taran district, India, after the creation of Pakistan in 1947). He was a businessman who founded the Ittefaq Group and Sharif Group in 1939. Muhammad's other son Shehbaz Sharif is the current Prime Minister of Pakistan.

Family members
First Generation
 Muhammad Sharif, father of Nawaz Sharif
Begum Shamim Akhtar, wife of Muhammad Sharif and mother of Nawaz Sharif, Shahbaz Sharif and Abbas Sharif. She died on 22 November 2020. 
Second Generation
 Nawaz Sharif, Former Prime Minister of Pakistan 
Kalsoom Nawaz Sharif, was the wife of Nawaz Sharif, and was the First Lady of Pakistan in three non-consecutive terms from 1990 until 1993, from 1996 until 1998 and from 2013 to 2018. She died in London in 2018. She had had cancer.
 Shehbaz Sharif, Former Chief Minister of Punjab, current Prime Minister of Pakistan. 
Begum Nusrat Shahbaz, first wife of Shahbaz Sharif
Tehmina Durrani, second wife of Shahbaz Sharif
 Abbas Sharif, a Pakistani businessman and brother of Nawaz Sharif and Shabaz Sharif. He died on 11 January 2013, after slipping and falling on an electric heater, which electrocuted him and caused a heart attack.
Sabiha Abbas, wife of Abbas Sharif.
Third Generation
 Hassan Nawaz Sharif, son of Nawaz Sharif.
 Hussain Nawaz Sharif, son of Nawaz Sharif.
 Maryam Nawaz Sharif, daughter of Nawaz Sharif, and is an active politician in Pakistan. She is married to Muhammad Safdar Awan, a former member of Pakistan's national assembly, and captain in the Pakistani army.. She ran elections campaigns for Pakistan Muslim League (N) in the 2013 Pakistani general election, and the 2018 Pakistani general election. In July 2018, she was sentenced to seven years in prison, along with a £2 million fine on corruption charges in the Avenfield reference case. On 19 September 2018, the Islamabad High Court suspended her sentence.
Asma Nawaz Sharif, daughter of Nawaz Sharif.
Rabia Imran, daughter of Shahbaz Sharif.
 Hamza Shahbaz Sharif, son of Shahbaz Sharif, leader of the Opposition in the Provincial Assembly of the Punjab, Member of the National Assembly
Suleman Shahbaz, son of Shahbaz Sharif, former CEO of Sharif Group.

Other relatives
 Safdar Awan, husband of Maryam Nawaz Sharif.
 The Great Gama, Abdul Qadir.
 Ishaq Dar, father-in-law of Asma Nawaz Sharif.
 Mohsin Latif, nephew of Kalsoom Nawaz

Wealth
The Sharif family owns Ittefaq Group and Sharif Group. The village Jati Umrah in Lahore, is also partially owned by the Sharif family.

According to the book 'Capitalism's Achilles Heel' by Raymond W Baker, former PML-N leader Nawaz Sharif made financial gains of $418 million during his two terms as the Prime Minister of Pakistan.

The book is a report on the corruption done by politics' most dominant mafias/families in history, which includes the Sharif family as well. It talks about how they accumulated their factories, properties and wealth.

Photos

See also
 Sharif
 Mian
 Raiwind
 List of political families

References

Further reading
 
 
 

First Families of Pakistan
Kashmiri families
Muslim families
Nawaz Sharif
Pakistan Muslim League (N) politicians
Political families of Pakistan
Punjabi families